Eudonia orthioplecta is a moth of the family Crambidae. It was described by Edward Meyrick in 1937 and is found in Fiji.

References

Moths described in 1937
Eudonia